Sycamore Township may refer to the following places in the United States:

 Sycamore Township, DeKalb County, Illinois
 Sycamore Township, Butler County, Kansas
 Sycamore Township, Montgomery County, Kansas, Montgomery County, Kansas
 Sycamore Township, Hamilton County, Ohio
 Sycamore Township, Wyandot County, Ohio

See also 
 Sycamore (disambiguation)

Township name disambiguation pages